Nikolas Besagno (born November 15, 1988) is an American former soccer player who is currently the manager of Washington Crossfire of the USL Premier Development League.

Career

Professional
One of the most touted young players in the country, Besagno became the first overall pick of the 2005 MLS SuperDraft when he was drafted by his former United States Under-17 coach and then Salt Lake boss John Ellinger. At the age of 16, Besagno, who signed a Generation Adidas contract with MLS, became the second-youngest player in league history to be drafted, behind 2004's number one overall choice, 14-year-old Freddy Adu.  In June 2008, Real Salt Lake loaned Besagno for ninety days to the Seattle Sounders of the USL First Division.  His older brother Jacob Besagno had previously spent two seasons with Seattle.

On November 24, 2008, Besagno was released by Real Salt Lake. Besagno started 2009 in camp with Seattle Sounders FC, but was cut toward the end of January. Having been unable to secure a professional contract, Besagno signed with Tacoma Tide of the USL Premier Development League for the 2009 season. Besagno was playing for PDL rival. On January 1, 2013 , Besagno retired. Washington Crossfire.

International
Besagno, a graduate of the Bradenton Academy, was a regular for the Under-17 United States national team, and later moved up to the Under-20 squad.  In 2005, he played two games for the USA U-17 team at the 2005 FIFA U-17 World Championship.

References

1988 births
Living people
People from Maple Valley, Washington
Sportspeople from King County, Washington
Soccer players from Washington (state)
American soccer players
American soccer coaches
Association football midfielders
Real Salt Lake players
Seattle Sounders (1994–2008) players
Seattle Sounders FC U-23 players
Kitsap Pumas players
Washington Crossfire players
Major League Soccer first-overall draft picks
Major League Soccer players
USL First Division players
USL League Two players
United States men's youth international soccer players
Real Salt Lake draft picks